Gyaritini is a tribe of longhorn beetles of the subfamily Lamiinae. It was described by Breuning in 1956.

Taxonomy
 Archeogyaritus Gouverneur & Vitali, 2016 
 Arachnogyaritus Gouverneur & Vitali, 2016 
 Ceylania Gouverneur & Vitali, 2016 
 Elegantogyaritus  Gouverneur & Vitali, 2016 
 Gyaritodes Breuning, 1947
 Gyaritus Pascoe, 1858
 Microleropsis Gressitt, 1937
 Nosavana Breuning, 1963
 Pseudoloessa  Gouverneur & Vitali, 2016 
 Retilla Lacordaire, 1872
 Tinkhamia Gressitt, 1937
 Yimnashana Gressitt, 1937
 Yimnashaniana Hua, 1986

References

 
Lamiinae
Taxa named by Stephan von Breuning (entomologist)